Richard 'Donald' McNeil (born 20 February 1958) was a Scottish footballer who played his entire 'senior' career with Dumbarton.

References

1958 births
Scottish footballers
Dumbarton F.C. players
Scottish Football League players
Living people
Place of birth missing (living people)
Association football midfielders